Lee Roy Martin (April 25, 1937 — 31 May 1972), known as The Gaffney Strangler, was an American serial killer from Gaffney, South Carolina. He murdered 4 people, 2 women and 2 girls between 1967 and 1968.

Background
When the killings began in 1967, Martin was employed at a textile mill in Cherokee County. He was married and had three children.

History and victims 
On May 20, 1967, 32-year-old Annie Lucille Dedmond was murdered. She had been strangled and raped. Her husband, Roger Dedmond, was arrested and convicted of her murder. He was sentenced to 18 years in prison.

Nine months later in February, 1968, Nancy Carol Parris, 20, was abducted. Her husband had reported her missing when she had taken their dog for a walk at night and never returned. Her nude body was later found on a riverbank beneath a bridge. She had been strangled and raped.

Nancy Christine Rhinehart, 14, was killed on February 8, 1968. Her body was found buried under a brush pile with one foot sticking out. She had been strangled and raped.

On Feb. 8, 1968, Lee Roy Martin anonymously called Bill Gibbons, then-editor of The Gaffney Ledger.  Martin gave Gibbons directions to locate two bodies. He insisted that he was responsible for the murder of Annie Dedmond, not her husband. Gibbons reported the information to police, who then found the bodies of Parris and Rhinehart. Four days later Martin contacted Gibbons again, warning that there would be more killings.

On February 13, 1968, 15-year-old Opal Dianne Buckson was abducted and thrown in the trunk of a car while walking to a school bus stop with her sister. Her sister was able to give a description of the vehicle to authorities. Police found Buckson's nude body in a wooded area several days later. There were indications of a struggle and she had been strangled and stabbed to death.

Investigation, arrest, and trial
After learning of Opal Buckson's abduction on the morning of February 13, local residents Henry Transou and Lester Skinner were patrolling the area, looking for a car that matched the description given over the radio by local police. Within hours of the abduction, they saw a car backed down a dirt path in a heavily-wooded area and a man standing beside it. When they drove by, the man quickly got inside and drove away. They wrote down the vehicle's plate numbers and reported what they'd seen to police. Investigators later found Buckson's body nearby to where Martin's car had been spotted.

Martin was arrested on February 27, 1968. The Sheriff took evidence from Martin and questioned him. Martin directed them to the location of bodies. However, in the process, Martin was not given adequate right to counsel, and so authorities did not seek the death penalty. Martin was convicted of first-degree murder in the deaths of Dedmond, Parris, Rhinehart, and Buckson. He received four life terms.

After Martin's arrest, Roger Dedmond, who was three months into his prison sentence, was released from Union County Prison Camp on March 1, 1968. All charges against him in the murder of his wife were dropped.

While the popular conception of Martin's motive was that he was "after young women," in prison interviews and in discussions with his mother Martin himself said he had a split personality, including a violent side that took control of him.

Aftermath
On May 31, 1972, while incarcerated at Central Correctional Institution in Columbia, Martin was stabbed to death by fellow inmate Kenneth Marshall Rumsey. Rumsey later killed himself in prison.

In popular culture 
The case was the subject of the Season 3 premiere of Investigation Discovery's series A Crime to Remember in 2015 ("Lock Up Your Daughters").
Subject of episode #176 in the podcast "Small Town Murder".Episode 176

See also 
 List of serial killers in the United States

References

Further reading

1937 births
1972 deaths
20th-century American criminals
American male criminals
American murderers of children
American people convicted of murder
American people who died in prison custody
American rapists
American serial killers
Deaths by stabbing in the United States
Male serial killers
People convicted of murder by South Carolina
Prisoners sentenced to life imprisonment by South Carolina
Prisoners who died in South Carolina detention
Serial killers murdered in prison custody
Violence against women in the United States